Morzyca  (formerly German Blumberg) is a village in the administrative district of Gmina Dolice, within Stargard County, West Pomeranian Voivodeship, in north-western Poland.

For the history of the region, see History of Pomerania.

In Morzyca there is a Catholic church of St. Josemaría Escrivá.

References

Morzyca